Anna Klein (16 February 1883 in Nuremberg – 25 November 1941 in Kaunas) was a German landscape, animal and genre painter. She specialized in motifs from Upper Bavaria and Tyrol and designed many utilitarian items such as labels, bookplates and postcards in addition to her canvases.

Biography 
She was born to a Jewish wine and hops merchant who had been converted to Protestantism. Anna herself became a convert to Catholicism at an early age. In 1900, she went to the artists' colony in Dachau, where she became a pupil at the private school of Hans von Hayek. In 1906, she went to the Netherlands to work a bit more with Hayek.

Two years later, she participated in an anatomy course taught by Franz Marc. One of the few photographs of her was taken at that time, with Marc and his future wife Bertha Marie Franck. In 1910, she graduated from the Königliche Kunstgewerbeschule München.

For a time, she worked as a private drawing teacher in Munich then, together with her friend,  Elisabeth Troll, established her own school. In 1919, 1920 and 1922, she participated in exhibitions at the Glaspalast. A major solo exhibition was held in Berlin in 1927.

In 1933, following the Nazi seizure of power, she was forced to close the school. Despite having suffered from rheumatism for many years, she was assigned to work in a mattress factory. As a Jew, she was not allowed to use public transportation, so she had to walk from her home on the west side of the city to Haidhausen and back every day. She was taken to Kaunas and executed in the Ninth Fort massacres of November 1941. Some sources erroneously give her place of death as Theresienstadt.

References

 Klein, Anna. In: Thieme-Becker, Allgemeines Lexikon der Bildenden Künstler von der Antike bis zur Gegenwart. Vol.20 E. A. Seemann, Leipzig 1927, pg.434.
 Klein, Anna. In: Hans Vollmer, Allgemeines Lexikon der bildenden Künstler des XX. Jahrhunderts. Vol.3. E. A. Seemann, Leipzig 1956, pg.59
 Jutta Mannes: Klein, Anna. In: Allgemeines Künstlerlexikon. Die Bildenden Künstler aller Zeiten und Völker (AKL). Vol.80, de Gruyter, Berlin 2014, pg.410

Further reading 
 Zweckverband Dachauer Galerien und Museen, Anna Klein und andere Künstlerinnen in Dachau um 1900. (exhibition catalog), Taschenbuch, 2008

External links 

Self-Portrait @ Brikada (very low quality image)

1883 births
1941 deaths
19th-century German painters
19th-century German women artists
20th-century German painters
20th-century German women artists
German women painters
German designers
Artists from Nuremberg
Jewish painters
German Jews who died in the Holocaust